North Londonderry may refer to:

In Northern Ireland
The northern part of County Londonderry
North Londonderry (Northern Ireland Parliament constituency)
North Londonderry (UK Parliament constituency)

In the United States
North Londonderry Township, Pennsylvania

See also
 Londonderry (disambiguation)
 Derry City (disambiguation)